The women's doubles of the 2018 Advantage Cars Prague Open tournament was played on clay in Prague, Czech Republic.

Anastasia Potapova and Dayana Yastremska were the defending champions, but both players chose not to participate.

Cornelia Lister and Nina Stojanović won the title, defeating Bibiane Schoofs and Kimberley Zimmermann in the final, 6–2, 2–6, [10–8].

Seeds

Draw

Draw

References

External Links
Main Draw

Advantage Cars Prague Open - Doubles
Advantage Cars Prague Open